Francis LeRoy Holmes (January 23, 1885 – February 14, 1980) was an American track and field athlete who competed in the 1908 Summer Olympics. He was born in Brazil and died in Sherman Oaks, Los Angeles, California.

In 1908 he finished fourth in the standing high jump competition and sixth in the standing long jump event.

References

External links

1885 births
1980 deaths
American male high jumpers
American male long jumpers
Olympic track and field athletes of the United States
Athletes (track and field) at the 1908 Summer Olympics